Artur Saramakha (born 6 June 1998) is a Belarusian professional football player currently playing for Molodechno.

References

External links
 
 
 Profile at Dinamo Minsk website

1998 births
Living people
Footballers from Minsk
Belarusian footballers
Association football forwards
FC Dinamo Minsk players
FC Oshmyany players
FC Arsenal Dzerzhinsk players
FC Slonim-2017 players
FC Molodechno players